Prunella Jane Ransome (18 January 1943 – 4 March 2002) was an English actress, primarily active on television and films.

Early life
Ransome was born in Croydon, Surrey.  She later lived in Fareham, England where her father, Jimmy Ransome, was headmaster of West Hill Park School from 1952 to 1958. Ransome studied at Elmhurst School for Dance and began her performing career as a teenager.

Career
Ransome made her West End debut in a 1959 musical production of Jane Eyre with further West End appearances in Do Re Mi and Oliver!. She later spent five months singing at a cabaret in Athens and upon returning to the UK worked delivering cars for a London automobile dealership prior to being cast in 1965 in the musical stage play The Match Girls. Following that play's 1966 West End transfer, Ransome's performance drew the attention of a producer of the 1967 film Far from the Madding Crowd, with a screen test leading to her playing that film's second female lead and her performance earning her a Golden Globe Award nomination.

Ransome progressed in her film career playing the female lead in the 1969 film Alfred the Great. Her subsequent screen career, however, was focused almost exclusively on television, Ransome having debuted in that medium in the 1967 serialisation of Kenilworth. In the 1970s she had major multi-episode roles in three well-regarded TV drama series: Warship and A Horseman Riding By for the BBC, and Dangerous Knowledge for Southern Television. She also appeared in other TV series of the period, such as Man at the Top, episode "I’ll Do the Dirty Work", in 1970. Also in 1970 she appeared in Granada TV series "A Family at War" - playing Dominique Brahaut the Girlfriend of Philip Ashton during his posting to the Channel Islands.
 
Ransome's rare film roles included the female leads in the western Man in the Wilderness (1971) and Narciso Ibáñez Serrador's Who Can Kill a Child?, a  1976 horror film which has become a cult favourite. She also played the female lead in the 1980 TV mini-series Seagull Island which was re-edited into the film The Secret of Seagull Island (1981). Ransome retired as a career actress following her participation in the 1984 television series Sorrell and Son, though she made occasional television guest appearances in the 1990s.

Personal life
She had two daughters, Charlotte (born 1973) and Victoria (born 1975) and was aunt to Thomas Ransome. In 1980 Ransome relocated from London to Suffolk. She died of natural causes in Norwich on 4 March 2002.

References

Sources
The Pittsburgh Press October 1, 1968 p. 14.

External links

1943 births
2002 deaths
English television actresses
English film actresses
People from Croydon
People educated at the Elmhurst School for Dance